Iconoclast (Part 1: The Final Resistance) is the fifth studio album by the German extreme metal band Heaven Shall Burn. The album was released in Europe on 28 January 2008, followed by an American release on 5 February 2008; both dates through Century Media Records.

The album entered the German Media Control chart at No. 21.

Track listing

Personnel 
Production and performance credits are adapted from the album liner notes.

 Heaven Shall Burn
 Marcus Bischoff – vocals
 Alexander Dietz – guitars, synthesizer, piano, producer
 Maik Weichert – guitars, producer
 Eric Bischoff – bass
 Matthias Voigt – drums

 Production
 Tue Madsen – mixing, mastering
 Patrick W. Engel – co-producer
 Ralf Müller – co-producer
 Bastian "BastiBasti" Sobtzick (Callejon) – artwork, layout
 Ólafur Arnalds – arrangement, recording, producer, mixing on "Awoken" and "Equinox"

 Additional musicians
 Patrick W. Engel – additional vocals on "Endzeit", additional guitar, bass
 Ólafur Arnalds – piano on "Awoken" and "Equinox"
 Margrét Soffia Einarsdóttir – violin on "Awoken" and "Equinox"
 Una Pétursdóffir – violin on "Awoken" and "Equinox"
 Arndis Hulda Audunsdóffir – viola on "Awoken" and "Equinox"
 Thordur Gudmundur Herrmannson – cello on "Awoken" and "Equinox"

Chart performance

References

External links 

2008 albums
Century Media Records albums
Heaven Shall Burn albums